Georgia made its Paralympic Games début at the 2008 Summer Paralympics in Beijing, sending a single representative to compete in powerlifting. The country's NPC was not established until 2003.

Medals

Medals by Summer Games

Medals by Winter Games

Medals by Summer Sport

Medals by Winter Sport

Medalists

Full results for Georgia at the Paralympics

See also
 Georgia at the Olympics

References